Janczak is a Polish-language surname.  Notable people with this surname include:

Eugeniusz Janczak (born 1955), Polish sports shooter
Krzysztof Janczak (born 1974), Polish volleyball player
Krzysztof Aleksander Janczak (born 1983), Polish composer

Polish-language surnames